Harold Ernest Jackson (12 November 1902 – 24 June 1980) was an Australian politician, elected as a member of the New South Wales Legislative Assembly representing the seat of Gosford between 1950 and 1965.

Notes

Members of the New South Wales Legislative Assembly
Liberal Party of Australia members of the Parliament of New South Wales
Central Coast (New South Wales)
1902 births
1980 deaths
20th-century Australian politicians